Komatsu may refer to:

Komatsu (surname), a Japanese surname
Komatsu, Ishikawa, a city in the Ishikawa prefecture in Japan
Komatsu Airport, an airport
Komatsu Limited, a company mostly known for manufacturing industrial machinery
Komatsu LAV, an armoured car
Komatsu, Ehime, a former town, merged into Saijō, Ehime
Komatsu (Japanese restaurant), a Japanese restaurant in Yokosuka, Kanagawa, Japan
Komatsu College, a private junior college in Komatsu, Ishikawa, Japan, established in 1988

See also
Komatsu-no-miya, a cadet branch of the Japanese royal family